Thomas Noel may refer to:

Thomas Noel (historian) (born 1945), American historian
Thomas Noel (poet) (1799–1861), English poet
Thomas Noel (MP) (died 1788), British MP for Rutland
Thomas Noel, 2nd Viscount Wentworth (1745–1815), British politician

See also
Thomas Noell (died 1702), mayor of New York City
Thomas E. Noell (1839–1867), U.S. Representative from Missouri